General elections were held in Oman in 1994. They were the first elections in a Gulf Arab country in which women could both vote and stand as a candidate.

Electoral system
Following the country's first national census in 1993, the electoral system was modified slightly from that used for the 1991 elections in which each wilayah was represented by one member in the Consultative Assembly. The 20 wilayahs with a population of over 30,000 were granted an extra representative, increasing the number of elected members from 59 to 80.

Single seat wilayahs elected two candidates and two-seat wilayahs elected four, of which half were chosen by Sayyid Fahd bin Mahmud and Sultan Qaboos to sit in the Consultative Assembly.

Although women had been able to vote in the 1991 elections, they had not been able to stand as candidates. However, the 1994 elections saw women able to stand in seats in the Muscat Governorate.

Results
Female candidates won two seats; Shakour bint Mohammed al-Ghamari in Muscat and Taiba al-Mawali in Seeb.

Members

References

1994 elections in Asia
1994
Election
Non-partisan elections